Michael Chaturantabut (born April 30, 1975) is a Thai American actor, martial artist and stuntman, best known for his role as Chad Lee, the Blue Ranger in Power Rangers Lightspeed Rescue. He was born in Rayong Province, Thailand.

Extreme martial arts
Xtreme Martial Arts or XMA is a brand name owned by Chaturantabut. Chaturantabut's XMA is a combination of elements from martial arts, acrobatics and gymnastics, with an emphasis on showmanship.

The concept of adding gymnastics-like tumbling moves to elements of traditional martial arts is otherwise known as "tricking". XMA makes these exhibition moves the focus of the sport. Open hand and weapons choreography are often accompanied by dramatic dance or programmatic music. The goal is to command the attention of the audience.

Currently there are schools of martial arts or similar XMA styles based in the United States, Australia, Canada, New Zealand and the United Kingdom, the World Headquarters being in North Hollywood, California. Many of the moves are high-flying aerial acrobatic maneuvers. These stunning movements attain the goal of capturing the crowd, improving physical agility, balance, strength, coordination, and endurance, as well as performing an artistic display of talent.

He feels that there are many basic moves that can be specialized to be more acrobatic, flashy and artistic, so as to give the impression of complexity and difficulty for showmanship purposes. It is for this reason that he feels that even the basic athlete or beginner can learn the progression from basic moves to highly complex acrobatic sequences.

Filmography

Personal life
Chaturantabut was trained at Sharkey's Karate Studios located in Naperville and Momence, Illinois. He was formerly married to McKenzie Satterthwaite and is also the founder of Extreme Martial Arts.

Chaturantabut is also the father of two sons, Talin and Gaige.

Chatrantabut attended Naperville North High School in Naperville, Illinois.

Notable facts
Chaturantabut was also Taylor Lautner's martial artist coach and encouraged him to get into acting.

References

External links
 
 XMA Official Website

1975 births
American male film actors
American male television actors 
American people of Chinese descent
American people of Thai descent
Living people
Martial arts school founders
Michael Chaturantabut
Michael Chaturantabut
Michael Chaturantabut
Michael Chaturantabut